Louis Alfred (Dutch) Legett (June 1, 1901 – March 6, 1988) was a backup catcher in Major League Baseball who played for the Boston Braves (1929) and Boston Red Sox (1933–1935). He was born in New Orleans.

In a four-season career, Legett was a .202 hitter (25-for-124) with 13 runs and eight RBI in 68 games, including three doubles and two stolen bases. He did not hit a home run. As a catcher, he recorded 98 outs with 23 assists and committed eight errors in 129 chances for a .938 fielding percentage.

Legget died in his hometown of New Orleans at age 86.

Transactions
November 7, 1928 – Was one of five players sent by the Chicago Cubs to the Boston Braves in exchange for Rogers Hornsby.
June 17, 1933 – Purchased by the Boston Red Sox from the Albany Senators (International League)

External links
Baseball Reference
Retrosheet

Boston Braves players
Boston Red Sox players
Major League Baseball catchers
Baseball players from New Orleans
1901 births
1988 deaths
Nashville Vols players